The Agate Falls Scenic Site is a waterfall and scenic site located in Interior Township, in southeastern Ontonagon County, Michigan.  The waterfall is 7 miles (11 km) southeast of Bruce Crossing, Michigan on the state highway M-28.

Agate Falls is a 39-foot-high (12 m) waterfall of the Middle Branch of the Ontonagon River. Dropping down from the highlands of the western Upper Peninsula, this river drops  from the Bond Falls Flowage to Lake Superior, and Agate Falls is part of this change in elevation. 
The water flows over a shelf of erosion-resistant sandstone.

The falls can be seen from a trail accessible from a parking lot on M-28 or from a sturdy railroad bridge which now is part of a snowmobile and atv trail.  This bridge, which once carried the tracks of the Duluth, South Shore and Atlantic Railway, spans the falls.  A roadside picnic area offers simple recreational opportunities.

References

External links
 Michigan Department of Natural Resources
 Ottawa National Forest - Agate Falls

Protected areas of Ontonagon County, Michigan
Waterfalls of Michigan
State parks of Michigan
Ottawa National Forest
Landforms of Ontonagon County, Michigan